was an early Heian period jōsaku-style Japanese castle located in what is now part of the city of Morioka, Iwate Prefecture in the Tōhoku region of far northern Honshu, Japan. The site was proclaimed a National Historic Site of Japan in 1979.

Background
In the late Nara period, after the establishment of a centralized government under the Ritsuryō system, the Yamato court sent a number of military expeditions to what later was designated Mutsu Province in northern Japan to bring the local Emishi tribes under its control.  The Emishi were able to successfully resist the Japanese for several decades; however,  in 802 AD, the Chinjufu-shōgun Sakanoue no Tamuramaro defeated Emishi chieftain Aterui, and many of the Emishi tribes in the Shiwa District submitted to Japanese rule. In 803 AD, Shiwa Castle, a large fortification with wooden walls,  was established in what later became part of the city of Morioka to serve as an administrative center of the imperial government. However, the site was prone to flooding, and in 811 AD, and Shiwa Castle was abandoned in favor of Tokutan Castle approximately ten kilometers to the south.

Description
There was a gate at the center of each side facing each of the cardinal directions, with yagura watchtowers were erected at  intervals. Within was a secondary palisade roughly  square, containing the 14 buildings making up the administrative compound. The palace compound was connected to the main south gate by a road  in width. From the size of the foundations of the barracks and workshops, the garrison was between 1200 and 2000 men.

Current situation
A large scale archaeological investigation was conducted by the Iwate Prefectural Board of Education from 1976 to 1977, in conjunction with the construction of the nearby Tōhoku Expressway.

See also
Emishi
Taga Castle
List of Historic Sites of Japan (Iwate)

References

External links

Iwate Prefectural Agency for Cultural Affairs 
Morioka city official home page 

9th-century establishments in Japan
Castles in Iwate Prefecture
Ruined castles in Japan
History of Iwate Prefecture
Heian period
Morioka, Iwate
Archaeological sites in Japan
Archaeological parks
Historic Sites of Japan
Buildings and structures completed in 803